Salon Basnet (Nepali: सलोन वस्नेत; born 23 March 1991), is a Nepali actor and model known for his work in Nepali cinema. He started his career in Nepali Film Industry as a child actor with a film, Nepali Babu in 1999. He rose to fame with super-hit Nepali films such as Hostel (2013), Yatra (2019), and Gajalu (2016).

Personal life 
Basnet was born on 23 March 1991 in Kathmandu, Nepal, to Meena Basnet and Shovit Basnet. His father, Shovit Basnet is also a renowned actor, producer, and director of his time. After four years of relationship, Basnet married Karishma KC in 2022.

Career 
Basnet debuted in 1999 as a child artist in a film, Nepali Babu. He played in many other movies as a child artist, such as Aafanta (1999), Dhukdhuki (2000), Pinjada (2001), and Hami Tin Bhai (2004). The first film he played as an adult was Hostel (2013).

Filmography

Accolades

References

External links 

 
 Salon Basnet on Instagram

Nepalese actors
Nepalese male models
Actors from Kathmandu
1991 births
Living people
Nepalese male child actors
21st-century Nepalese male actors
20th-century Nepalese male actors